The People's Congress of the Tibet Autonomous Region is one of the organs of local self-governance in Tibet. Following decisions taken by the National People's Congress of the People's Republic of China, the founding of the Tibet Autonomous Region and the regional government was officially announced during the first session of the Tibetan People's Congress in September 1965 in Lhasa. In theory, all adult Tibetans have the right to elect their leaders who administer the province.

See also 

 CCP Committee Secretary
 Chinese People's Political Consultative Conference

References

Further reading 

Tibet Autonomous Region
1965 establishments in China